Kasthooriman is a 2003 Indian Malayalam-language romantic drama film written and directed by A. K. Lohithadas. The film shows the relationship developed between Sajan Joseph Alukka (Kunchako Boban) and Priyamvada (Meera Jasmine). Lohithadas remade this film in Tamil under the same title.

Plot

Sajan Joseph Alukka (Kunchako Boban) is a soft-spoken and studious young man, while his junior Priyamvada (Meera Jasmine) is smart and outgoing. Her close friend is in love with Sajan, but he avoids her by saying that his only ambition in life is to study hard and become an IAS officer.

But Priya follows him and digs out the truth that though he hails from a rich family, his father has now gone bankrupt and has no money even to pay the exam fee. On hearing this, her friend ditches him. Slowly Priya starts having a soft corner for him. She even pays his fees, but Sajan tries to avoid her and treats this as an insult.

One day Sajan meets Priya in his father's friend's house. He is shocked to learn that she is a servant there. Sajan realizes that she works as a domestic servant in five houses to look after her family and pay for her education. He admires her and develops feelings for her.

Priya helps him with money to go for his IAS coaching in Delhi and it is the happiest day for her when Sajan gets his IAS. But Priya murders her abusive brother-in-law in self-defense and is sent to prison. Sajan waits for her return and the two are reunited after Priya's prison term is completed.

Cast

Kunchacko Boban as Sajan Joseph Alukka, IAS
Meera Jasmine as Priyamvada (Priya) 
Shammi Thilakan as Rajendran
Kalasala Babu as Lonappan 
 Lishoy as Joseph Alukka, father of Sajan Joseph Alukka
 Cochin Haneefa as Younis, House Owner
 Sandra Amy as Sheela Paul
Bindu Murali as Alice
 Ambika Mohan as Vanaja, mother of Priyamvada & Raji
Sona Nair as Raji, sister of Priyamvada
 Kulappulli Leela as Raji's mother-in-law
Suma Jayaram as House owner
Devi Chandana as Nancy, Sajan's sister
Sadiq as Jacob, Sajan's brother-in-law
 Rema Devi as College lecturer
Nandakishore 
 Nivedya as Police officer

Box office
The film received positive reviews and became commercial success at the box office.

Awards
Kerala State Film Awards 2003
Best Actress - Meera Jasmine
 Filmfare Awards South
 Filmfare Award for Best Actress - Malayalam - Meera Jasmine

Soundtrack 
The film's soundtrack contains eight songs, all composed by Ouseppachan, with lyrics by Kaithapram Damodaran Namboothiri.

References

External links 
 

2003 films
2000s Malayalam-language films
Indian romantic drama films
Malayalam films remade in other languages
Films with screenplays by A. K. Lohithadas
Films scored by Ouseppachan
Films directed by A. K. Lohithadas
2003 romantic drama films
Films shot in Thrissur